Neil Lewis may refer to:

 Sir Neil Elliott Lewis (1858–1935), Australian politician
 Neil Lewis (footballer) (born 1974), English football defender
 Neil Lewis (journalist) former journalist with the New York Times